IAMI may stand for: 
Indian Association for Medical Informatics 
Iran Aircraft Manufacturing Industrial Company
I Am I (band)